United Nations Security Council Resolution 124 was adopted on March 7, 1957. After examining the application of Ghana for membership of the United Nations, the Council unanimously recommended to the General Assembly that Ghana be admitted.

Resolution 124 was adopted unanimously by all 11 members of the council.

See also
List of United Nations Security Council Resolutions 101 to 200 (1953–1965)

References 
Text of the Resolution at undocs.org

External links
 

 0124
 0124
History of Ghana
Foreign relations of Ghana
1957 in Ghana
 0124
March 1957 events